Breach is the second extended play by Scottish singer-songwriter Lewis Capaldi. It was released as a digital download on 8 November 2018. It includes the singles "Tough", "Grace" and "Someone You Loved" and a demo of "Something Borrowed". Zane Lowe premiered "Someone You Loved" on Apple's Beats 1 radio on the day of release.

Critical reception
Capitol Records said, "With its emotionally resonant, beautifully observed songs about love and relationships, Breach is yet another showcase for Capaldi’s vocal and songwriting talent."

Track listing

Charts

Weekly charts

Year-end charts

Certifications

References

2018 EPs
Lewis Capaldi albums
Virgin EMI Records EPs
Albums produced by TMS (production team)